Running from the Guns (originally known as Free Enterprise) is a 1987 Australian crime thriller film directed by John Dixon and starring Jon Blake, Mark Hembrow, Nikki Coghill, Terence Donovan, and Peter Whitford. It is a buddy action film set in Melbourne.

Premise
Two friends, Dave and Peter, accidentally pick up the wrong truck at the docks, which contains contraband wanted by some criminals.

Cast
Jon Blake as Davie
Mark Hembrow as Peter
Terence Donovan as Bangles
Nikki Coghill as Jill
Peter Whitford as Terry
Patrick Ward as Mulcahy
Warwick Sims as Simon Martin
Bill Kerr as Gilman

Production
Filming took place in late 1985.

Reception
The film received poor reviews.

Filmink later said "There’s no reason films like this couldn’t have worked in Australia, this just wasn’t done that well."

References

External links

Running from the Guns at Oz Movies
Running from the Guns at Screen Australia

1987 films
Australian action films
1987 action films
1980s English-language films
1980s Australian films